Carex parvigluma is a tussock-forming species of perennial sedge in the family Cyperaceae. It is native to Arunachal Pradesh in north eastern India in the eastern part of the Himalayas.

See also
List of Carex species

References

parvigluma
Plants described in 1894
Taxa named by Charles Baron Clarke
Flora of Arunachal Pradesh